The ISO metric screw thread is the most commonly used type of general-purpose screw thread worldwide. They were one of the first international standards agreed when the International Organization for Standardization (ISO) was set up in 1947.

The "M" designation for metric screws indicates the nominal outer diameter of the screw thread, in millimetres. This is also referred to as the "major" diameter in the information below. It indicates the diameter of smooth-walled hole that a male thread (e.g. on a bolt) will pass through easily to create a well-located connection to an internally threaded component (e.g. a nut) on the other side. That is, an M6 screw has a nominal outer diameter of 6 millimetres and will therefore be a well-located, co-axial fit in a hole drilled to 6 mm diameter.

Basic profile

The design principles of ISO general-purpose metric screw threads ("M" series threads) are defined in international standard ISO 68-1. Each thread is characterized by its major diameter, D (Dmaj in the diagram), and its pitch, P. ISO metric threads consist of a symmetric V-shaped thread. In the plane of the thread axis, the flanks of the V have an angle of 60° to each other. The thread depth is 0.54125 × pitch. The outermost  and the innermost  of the height H of the V-shape are cut off from the profile.

The relationship between the height H and the pitch P is found using the following equation where θ is half the included angle of the thread, in this case 30°:

or

In an external (male) thread (e.g. on a bolt), the major diameter Dmaj and the minor diameter Dmin define maximum dimensions of the thread. This means that the external thread must end flat at Dmaj, but can be rounded out below the minor diameter Dmin. Conversely, in an internal (female) thread (e.g. in a nut), the major and minor diameters are minimum dimensions; therefore the thread profile must end flat at Dmin but may be rounded out beyond Dmaj. In practice this means that one can measure the diameter over the threads of a bolt to find the nominal diameter Dmaj, and the inner diameter of a nut is Dmin.

The minor diameter Dmin and effective pitch diameter Dp are derived from the major diameter and pitch as

Tables of the derived dimensions for screw diameters and pitches defined in ISO 261 are given in ISO 724.

Designation
A metric ISO screw thread is designated by the letter M followed by the value of the nominal diameter D (the maximum thread diameter) and the pitch P, both expressed in millimetres and separated by the multiplication sign, × (e.g. M8×1.25). If the pitch is the normally used "coarse" pitch listed in ISO 261 or ISO 262, it can be omitted (e.g. M8).

The length of a machine screw or bolt is indicated by a following × and the length expressed in millimetres (e.g. M8×1.25×30 or M8×30).

Tolerance classes defined in ISO 965-1 can be appended to these designations, if required (e.g. M500– 6g in external threads). External threads are designated by lowercase letter, g or h. Internal threads are designated by upper case letters, G or H.

Preferred sizes

ISO 261 specifies a detailed list of preferred combinations of outer diameter D and pitch P for ISO metric screw threads. ISO 262 specifies a shorter list of thread dimensions – a subset of ISO 261.

The thread values are derived from rounded Renard series.  They are defined in ISO 3, with "1st choice" sizes being from the Rˈˈ10 series and "2nd choice" and "3rd choice" sizes being the remaining values from the Rˈˈ20 series.

The coarse pitch is the commonly used default pitch for a given diameter. In addition, one or two smaller fine pitches are defined, for use in applications where the height of the normal coarse pitch would be unsuitable (e.g. threads in thin-walled pipes). The terms coarse and fine have (in this context) no relation to the manufacturing quality of the thread.

In addition to coarse and fine threads, there is another division of extra fine, or superfine threads, with a very fine pitch thread. Superfine pitch metric threads are occasionally used in automotive components, such as suspension struts, and are commonly used in the aviation manufacturing industry. This is because extra fine threads are more resistant to coming loose from vibrations. Fine and superfine threads also have a greater minor diameter than coarse threads, which means the bolt or stud has a greater cross-sectional area (and therefore greater load-carrying capability) for the same nominal diameter.

Spanner (wrench) sizes
Below are some common spanner (wrench) sizes for metric screw threads. Hexagonal (generally abbreviated to "hex") head widths (width across flats, spanner size) are for DIN 934 hex nuts and hex head bolts. Other (usually smaller) sizes may occur to reduce weight or cost, including the small series flange bolts defined in ISO 4162 which typically have hexagonal head sizes corresponding to the smaller 1st choice thread size (eg. M6 small series flange bolts have 8mm hexagonal heads, as would normally be found on M5 bolts).

Standards

International
 ISO 68-1: ISO general purpose screw threads — Basic profile — Metric screw threads.
 ISO 261: ISO general purpose metric screw threads — General plan.
 ISO 262: ISO general purpose metric screw threads — Selected sizes for screws, bolts and nuts.
 ISO 965: ISO general purpose metric screw threads — Tolerances
 ISO 965-1: Principles and basic data
 ISO 965-2: Limits of sizes for general purpose external and internal screw threads.
 ISO 965-3: Deviations for constructional screw threads
 ISO 965-4: Limits of sizes for hot-dip galvanized external screw threads to mate with internal screw threads tapped with tolerance position H or G after galvanizing
 ISO 965-5: Limits of sizes for internal screw threads to mate with hot-dip galvanized external screw threads with maximum size of tolerance position h before galvanizing

National
 BS 3643: ISO metric screw threads
 ANSI/ASME B1.13M: Metric Screw Threads: M Profile
 ANSI/ASME B4.2-1978 (R2009): Preferred Metric Limits and Fits
 DIN13, page 519

Derived standards 
Japan has a JIS metric screw thread standard that largely follows the ISO, but with some differences in pitch and head sizes.

See also

 ASTM A325M
 ASTM F568M
 British Association screw threads (BA)
 British Standard Cycle (BSC)
 British standard fine thread (BSF)
 British standard pipe thread (BSP)
 British Standard Whitworth (BSW) – a British thread standard with 55° profile.
 Buttress thread
 Engineering tolerance
 Garden hose thread
 List of drill and tap sizes
 National pipe thread (NPT)
 National thread
 Nominal size
 Panzergewinde
 Photographic Filter thread
 Preferred metric sizes
 Screw thread
 Square thread form
 Thread angle
 Trapezoidal thread forms
 United States Standard thread
 Unified Thread Standard (UTS, UNC, UNF, UNEF and UNS) – a US/Canadian/British thread standard that uses the same 60° profile as metric threads, but an inch-based set of diameter/pitch combinations.

References

Bibliography

External links
 Diagrams and tables of many screwthread series. In German
 DIN 931: M1,6 to M39 Hexagon head bolts (Product grades A and B)(1987)
 IS 9519: Fasteners - Hexagon products - Width across flats, Indian standard (2013)
 Metric screw thread profile, dimensions and tolerances

Thread standards
Screws
ISO 68